Follows is a surname. Notable people with the surname include:

 Dave Follows (1941–2003), British cartoonist
 Denis Follows (1908–1983), British sports administrator
 Geoffrey Follows (1896–1983), British colonial administrator
 Megan Follows (born 1968), Canadian-American actress